Krummbek Manor (German: Herrenhaus Krummbek) is a manor house in the municipality of Lasbek. It is  a listed historical monument.

History 
In the late Middle Ages Krummbek, for the first time documented in 1327, was a farming village belonging to the abbey of Reinfeld. Later it was affiliated as a Meierhof to Schulenburg Manor (Gut Schulenburg). As such it was owned by the famous Marshal of France Count Nicolas Luckner (1722–1794), the great-grandfather of the not less famous navy officer and war hero Count Felix Luckner. When Count Nicolas Luckner was beheaded at the age of 72 during the Reign of Terror under the guillotine in Paris, Schulenburg manor including Krummbek passed to his son. Krummbek as an autonomous manor was created when count Luckner split it in 1803 from Schulenburg Manor. Its first owner was Baron Ludwig Carl Christoph von Liliencron (1777–1846), married to Countess Juliane von Luckner (1788–1863), who was an officer in the Napoleonic Wars. He had the manor house in 1803 erected by Christian Frederik Hansen in the neoclassical style. Later Krummbek came into the ownership of Hamburg merchants, thereunder Robert Jauch (1856–1909) of the Jauch family. In 1885, when he was Lord of Krummbek it had 67 inhabitants. Both his son the Freikorps leader and the German revolution Colonel Hans Jauch (1883–1965) and his daughter Luise Jauch (1885–1933) grew up at Krummbek. Luise Jauch was head nurse at The Magic Mountain at Davos, the second famous novel of Thomas Mann, when his wife Katia Mann stayed there in 1912. Luise Jauch's traits were utilized by Mann for the novel's head nurse Adritacia von Mylendonk. In 1909, Krummbek was bought by the Lampe family.

In 1928, Krummbek was incorporated into the village of Barkhorst and in 1974 it became a district of the municipality of Lasbek.

Sources 
 Hubertus Neuschäffer, Schlösser und Herrenhäuser in Südholstein: ein Handbuch, 1984

See also 
 List of castles in Schleswig-Holstein

External links 
 The Manors in the district of Stormarn
 Schulenburg Manor bei www.gemeinde-poelitz.de
 Boundary stone between Krummbek and Schulenburg

References 

Neoclassical architecture in Germany
Castles in Schleswig-Holstein
Jauch family
Houses completed in 1803
Buildings and structures in Stormarn (district)
Manor houses in Germany
Christian Frederik Hansen buildings
Stormarn (district)